Institute of Pulse Processes and Technologies (IPPT) of the National Academy of Sciences of Ukraine is a research institute of the National Academy of Sciences of Ukraine.

History
In 1959 on an initiative of young enthusiasts and support of the Mykolaiv city authorities there was created a joint laboratory for studying a new phenomenon at that time as high-voltage charge in water (see electrohydrodynamics) and processes that accompany it.

Institute was established in 1991 on the basis of Planning and Design Bureau of Electrohydraulics of National Academy of Sciences of Ukraine, which existed in Mykolaiv since 1962. It specializes in studies of physical and technical aspects of high-voltage electric discharge in condensed matter, the creation of highly environmentally friendly resource and energy saving pulse technology on its basis.

IPPT is a scientific-industrial complex that includes the  Institute, a research plant and research and development center "VEGA". The structure of the institute - five academic departments (electrophysical studies dept., dept.  of pulse energy conversion processes and their management, dept. of  methods and techniques of pulsed impact onto liquid metals and crystallizing alloys, dept. of the intensification  of production of minerals, dept. of pulse electrical systems), and three engineering department.

More than 1000 technological systems for the foundry, metallurgical, mining and other industries were developed in the IPPT. The following unique facilities were created: Laboratory park for studying the physical processes in the electric explosion, pulsed power capacitors laboratory for the study of processes in the cores of rock at a pressure of 500 atmospheres and temperatures up to 1000 °C and metallographic and metallophysical complexes.

Since 1977 the Institute and its predecessor are publishing a collection of scientific papers.

Directors
 1962 — 1969 Oleksandr Sorochynskyi
 1969 — 1988 Hryhoriy Hulyi
 1988 — Oleksandr Vovchenko

External links
 Official website

Research institutes in Ukraine
Institutes of the National Academy of Sciences of Ukraine
NASU department of physical and technical issues of material studies
Engineering research institutes
Materials science institutes
Buildings and structures in Mykolaiv
Research institutes in the Soviet Union
1962 establishments in the Soviet Union
Research institutes established in 1962